Princess Mary Adelaide of Cambridge  (Mary Adelaide Wilhelmina Elizabeth; 27 November 1833 – 27 October 1897), later known as the Duchess of Teck, was a member of the British royal family. She was one of the first royals to patronise a wide range of charities.

Mary Adelaide was the daughter of Prince Adolphus, Duke of Cambridge, and Princess Augusta of Hesse-Kassel. Her father was the seventh son of King George III and Queen Charlotte. Mary Adelaide married Francis, Duke of Teck, with whom she had four children. The Duke and Duchess of Teck's daughter, "May", was the wife of George V and became known as Queen Mary. Through her daughter, Mary Adelaide was the grandmother of the British kings Edward VIII and George VI.

Early life

Mary Adelaide was born on 27 November 1833 in the Kingdom of Hanover, German Confederation. Her father was Prince Adolphus, Duke of Cambridge, the youngest surviving son of George III and Charlotte of Mecklenburg-Strelitz. Her mother was Princess Augusta of Hesse-Kassel, the daughter of Prince Frederick of Hesse-Kassel. As a male-line granddaughter of a British monarch, she was styled as a British princess with the prefix of Royal Highness.

The young princess was baptised on 9 January 1834 at Cambridge House, Hanover, by Rev John Ryle Wood, Chaplain to the Duke of Cambridge. Her godmother and paternal aunt Princess Elizabeth, Landgravine of Hesse-Homburg, was the only godparent who was present. The others were William IV and Queen Adelaide (her paternal uncle and aunt), Princess Mary, Duchess of Gloucester and Edinburgh (her paternal aunt), Princess Marie of Hesse-Cassel (her maternal aunt) and Princess Marie Luise Charlotte of Hesse-Kassel (her maternal first cousin). She was named Mary Adelaide Wilhelmina Elizabeth for her aunts and uncle.

Mary Adelaide spent the early years of her life in Hanover, where her father acted as viceroy, in place of her uncles George IV and later William IV.

After the death of William IV, Mary Adelaide's first cousin, Princess Victoria of Kent, ascended the throne in 1837. However, Salic law prevented Victoria from ascending the throne of Hanover, which instead passed to Prince Ernest Augustus, Duke of Cumberland. Thus, the personal union which had existed for over a century between Britain and Hanover came to an end along with the arrangement of Hanover's ruler living in England as the British monarch and using a viceroy to represent him in Hanover. The Duke of Cumberland moved to Hanover as King and Mary Adelaide's father, no longer needed in Hanover, returned to London with his family, setting up residence in Kensington Palace.

Marriage

By the age of 30, Mary Adelaide was still unmarried. This situation was largely of her own choosing, as she had declared that she did not want to leave Britain, and would not marry a husband who would require her to live abroad. Suitors for her hand included Prince Wilhelm of Baden; the Duke of Brunswick; and the Duke of Saxe-Meiningen, while reportedly Napoleon III considered proposing to her but was deterred by her unwillingness to leave her home country. At one point Victor Emmanuel II of Italy was thought of as possible husband for Mary Adelaide. He had a scandalous reputation and was a notorious womanizer; it was said that whenever he visited a country he went to the theatre and music halls and sent notes propositioning the chorus girls. His behaviour in England did little to enhance his reputation. Mary Adelaide's above-average weight (earning her the disparaging epithet of "Fat Mary") and lack of income were also considered to deter potential suitors, as was her advancing age. However, her royal rank prevented her from marrying someone not of royal blood, and Mary had reportedly resigned herself to living out her days as a "jolly old maid". Her cousin, Queen Victoria, and Victoria's son the Prince of Wales took pity on her and attempted to arrange pairings.

Eventually a suitable candidate was found by the Prince of Wales and his wife Princess Alexandra on a visit to the Austrian court at Vienna in 1865. During the visit, they met and took a liking to a young officer in the Austrian Army, Prince Francis of Teck, a minor member of the royal family of Württemberg. Francis was of lower rank than Mary Adelaide, was the product of a morganatic marriage and had no succession rights to the throne of Württemberg, but was at least of princely title and of royal blood. He was also considered to be "the most handsome man at the Austrian court", where he was known as Der schöne Uhlan, "the handsome cavalry officer". The Prince of Wales invited the young officer to visit the royal court in Britain, and upon Francis's arrival on 6 March 1866 arranged for him to meet Mary Adelaide. "The wooing was but a short affair", according to Mary Adelaide: the pair were introduced on 7 March 1866, and a month later were engaged, much to the satisfaction of Mary Adelaide's family. "Everyone seemed to think it would do", Mary Adelaide's daughter May would later say, "and it did." The couple were married on 12 June 1866 at St Anne's Church, Kew, Surrey.Despite money problems, and perennial dissatisfaction about their low ranking within the British royal family, it would prove to be a happy marriage.

The Duke and Duchess of Teck chose to reside in London rather than abroad, mainly because Mary Adelaide received £5,000 per annum as a Parliamentary annuity and carried out royal duties. Her mother, the Duchess of Cambridge, also provided her with supplementary income. Requests to Queen Victoria for extra funds were generally refused; however, the queen did provide the Tecks with apartments at Kensington Palace and White Lodge in Richmond Park as a country house.

Mary Adelaide requested that her new husband be granted the style Royal Highness, but this was refused by Queen Victoria. The queen did, however, promote Francis to the rank of Highness in 1887 in celebration of her Golden Jubilee.

Children
The Tecks had one daughter and three sons:

Life abroad

Despite the couple's modest income, Mary Adelaide had expensive tastes and lived an extravagant life of parties, expensive food and clothes and holidays abroad. In 1883 they were forced to live more cheaply abroad in order to reduce their debts. With their children, they travelled to Florence, Italy, and also stayed with relatives in Germany and Austria. Initially, they travelled under the names of the Count and Countess von Hohenstein. However, Mary Adelaide wished to travel in more style and reverted to her actual title, which commanded significantly more attention and better service.

Later life and death
The Tecks returned from their self-imposed exile in 1885 and continued to live at Kensington Palace and White Lodge in Richmond Park. Mary Adelaide began devoting her life to charity, serving as patron to Barnardo's and other children's charities.

In 1891, Mary Adelaide was keen for her daughter, Princess Victoria Mary of Teck (known as "May"), to marry one of the sons of the Prince of Wales, the future Edward VII.  At the same time, Queen Victoria wanted a British-born bride for the future king, though of course one of royal rank and ancestry, and Mary Adelaide's daughter fulfilled the rank criteria. After Queen Victoria's approval, May became engaged to Prince Albert Victor, Duke of Clarence and Avondale, second in line to the British throne. He died suddenly six weeks later. Queen Victoria was fond of Princess Mary and persuaded the Duke of Clarence's brother and next in the line of succession, Prince George, Duke of York, to marry her instead. They married in the Chapel Royal, St James's Palace, on 6 July 1893.

Mary Adelaide never lived to see her daughter become Princess of Wales or Queen, as she died on 27 October 1897 at White Lodge, following an emergency operation. She was buried on 3 November 1897 in the Royal Vault at St George's Chapel, Windsor.

Mary Adelaide Close in Kingston Vale, on the edge of Richmond Park, is named after her.

Titles, styles, honours and arms

 27 November 1833 – 12 June 1866: Her Royal Highness Princess Mary Adelaide of Cambridge
 12 June 1866 – 16 December 1871: Her Royal Highness The Princess of Teck or Her Royal Highness The Princess Mary Adelaide (The Princess of Teck)
 16 December 1871 – 27 October 1897: Her Royal Highness The Duchess of Teck

As a male-line granddaughter of the British monarch, she was styled Her Royal Highness Princess Mary Adelaide of Cambridge at birth. As the male-line granddaughter of a king of Hanover, Princess Mary Adelaide also bore the titles of Princess of Hanover and Duchess of Brunswick-Lüneburg.

Honours
 Companion of the Imperial Order of the Crown of India, 1878
 Order of St John Lady of Justice, 1896

Ancestors

References

Sources
 Jackman, S.W. (1984) The People's Princess : Portrait of Princess Mary, Duchess of Teck, Kensal Press; .
 
 

Cambridge, Princess Mary Adelaide of
Cambridge, Princess Mary Adelaide of
British princesses
Daughters of British dukes
House of Hanover
Hanoverian princesses
Companions of the Order of the Crown of India
Cambridge, Mary Adelaide of
Burials at St George's Chapel, Windsor Castle
Teck-Cambridge family
Residents of White Lodge, Richmond Park
People from Hanover